Mike Venezia Memorial Award is an American Thoroughbred horse racing honor given annually by the New York Racing Association to honor a jockey who exemplifies extraordinary sportsmanship and citizenship. The award was created in 1989 to honor the memory of jockey Mike Venezia, who was killed in a racing accident in October, 1988 at Belmont Park.

The award is determined by voting from jockeys, turf writers and racing fans. The winner is announced in July of each year and at a ceremony held in the fall, each recipient receives a 13-inch bronze sculpture with a title that reads, "The Jockey, A Champion."

Recipients
 1989 : Mike Venezia (posthumously)
 1990 : Bill Shoemaker
 1991 : Chris McCarron 
 1992 : Ángel Cordero Jr.
 1993 : Jerry Bailey
 1994 : Mike E. Smith
 1995 : Pat Day
 1996 : Laffit Pincay Jr.
 1997 : Robbie Davis
 1998 : Eddie Maple 
 1999 : Gary Stevens
 2000 : Jorge F. Chavez
 2001 : Mike Luzzi
 2002 : Dean Kutz 
 2003 : Richard Migliore
 2004 : Patti Cooksey
 2005 : No award given
 2006 : Edgar Prado
 2007–2012 :  No award given
 2013 : Ramon Domínguez
 2014 : John Velazquez
 2015 : Jon Court
 2016 : Mario Pino
 2017 : Kendrick Carmouche
 2018 : Joe Bravo
 2019 : Javier Castellano
 2021: DeShawn Parker
 2022: Julien Leparoux

References

Horse racing awards